Las Kellies is an Argentine post-punk group formed in 2005 by Cecilia Kelly (vocals/guitar) and Silvina Costa (vocals/drums). They currently perform with Manuela Ducatenzeiler.

The group has been signed to Fire Records since 2010 and have released five albums: Shaking Dog (2007), Kalimera (2009), Kellies (2011)Total Exposure (2013) and Friends & Lovers (2016).

Biography 

The band was formed when Kelly and Costa met at a concert in 2005 and decided to form a female rock band. They opted to use the surname of their lead singer and guitarist Cecilia Kelly as a name for the band. Since then all members use the same surname as a pseudonym. Their original bass player Titi Kelly left the band before the release of their first album in 2007 for personal reasons and was replaced by JJ Kelly. Ceci Kelly is the main songwriter, while the band occasionally play Devo covers. The band made their live debut in Buenos Aires.

After playing together for over two years, Las Kellies released his first album, Shaking Dog in January 2007 on their own independent label. The songs of this album are mainly composed by Ceci Kelly.

Their second album, Kalimera, was released in June 2009. On this occasion Ceci co-wrote the eleven songs with the other two members. The trio toured Europe for the first time, performing at several festivals, such as Down By The River, Open Air, Secret Garden Party, Teenitus Fest, Festival Jarana or Fusion Festival.

Their third album entitled Kellies was released in January 2010. It contained 14 songs and was recorded in Argentina. The album was mixed by Dennis Bovell and released through Fire Records in the UK. In 2011, bass player JJ Kelly left the group and was replaced by Adry Kelly. In 2012 they joined with the German duo Mouse on Mars and featured on the mini album WOW.

Adry left the band in 2013 and was replaced with Sofi Kelly. This trio record the album Total Exposure together with Bovell. In 2016 they released their fifth album Friends & Lovers, produced by Iván Diaz Mathé. It was preceded by the single "Summer Breeze" and "Make it Real". The trio embarked on a European tour throughout November–December 2016.

Members

Current 
 Ceci Kelly (vocals and guitars)
 Sil Kelly (drums and vocals)

See also 
 Latino punk
 Rock en espagnol
 La Onda

References 

Argentine rock music groups
Fire Records (UK) artists
Argentine post-punk music groups